Rhagastis is a genus of moths in the family Sphingidae first described by Walter Rothschild and Karl Jordan in 1903.

Species
Rhagastis acuta (Walker 1856)
Rhagastis albomarginatus (Rothschild 1894)
Rhagastis binoculata Matsumura 1909
Rhagastis castor (Walker 1856)
Rhagastis confusa Rothschild & Jordan 1903
Rhagastis diehli Haxaire & Melichar, 2010
Rhagastis gloriosa (Butler 1875)
Rhagastis hayesi Diehl 1982
Rhagastis lambertoni (Clark 1923)
Rhagastis lunata (Rothschild 1900)
Rhagastis meridionalis Gehlen, 1928
Rhagastis mongoliana (Butler 1876)
Rhagastis olivacea (Moore 1872)
Rhagastis rubetra Rothschild & Jordan 1907
Rhagastis trilineata Matsumura 1921
Rhagastis velata (Walker 1866)

Gallery

References

 
Macroglossini
Moth genera
Taxa named by Walter Rothschild
Taxa named by Karl Jordan